Carlo Lizzani (3 April 1922 – 5 October 2013) was an Italian film director, screenwriter and critic.

Biography
Born in Rome, before World War II Lizzani worked as a scenarist on such films as Roberto Rossellini's Germany Year Zero, Alberto Lattuada's The Mill on the Po (both 1948) and Giuseppe De Santis' Bitter Rice (1949), for which he received an Academy Award nomination for Best Original Story.

After directing documentaries, he debuted as a feature director with the admired World War II drama Achtung! Banditi! (1951). Respected for his awarded drama Chronicle of Poor Lovers (1954), he has proven a solid director of genre films, notably crime films such as The Violent Four (1968) and Crazy Joe (1974) or crime-comedy Roma Bene (1971). His film L'oro di Roma (1961) examined events around the final deportation of the Jews of Rome and the Roman roundup, grande  razzia, of October 1943. For his 1968 film  Bandits in Milan he won a David di Donatello award as best director and a Nastro d'Argento award for best screenplay.

Lizzani worked frequently for Italian television in the 1980s and supervised the Venice International Film Festival for four editions, from 1979 to 1982.  In 1994 Lizzani was a member of the jury at the Berlin Film Festival.

For his 1996 film Celluloide, which deals with the making of Rome, Open City, he received another David di Donatello award for his screenplay.

While preparing for the film L'orecchio del potere ("The Ear of Power", a project he cultivated since the late nineties with the title Operazione Appia Antica), Lizzani committed suicide in Rome at the age of 91, when he jumped from the balcony of his apartment in Via dei Gracchi on 5 October 2013. On 10 October his coffin was transferred to a room in the Capitol that was set up as a funeral home, and the following day the civil funeral was held. Later, his body was transferred to the Flaminian cemetery for cremation.

Legacy 
In 2014 his family established the Lizzani Prize in his honor, which became one of the collaterals of the Venice Film Festival and is destined for Italians exhibitors that have given more space to quality cinema in cinemas.

Personal life 
Since 1949 he was married with painter Edith Bieber, whom he met in Berlin during the filming of the Roberto Rossellini film Germania anno zero.

Filmography

 The Sun Still Rises (1946)
Viaggio al sud, documentary (1949)
Via Emilia Km 147, documentary (1949)
Nel Mezzogiorno qualcosa è cambiato, documentary (1950)
Modena, città dell'Emilia Rossa, documentary (1950)
Achtung! Banditi! (1951)
L'amore che si paga, episode of the film L'amore in città (1953)
 At the Edge of the City, coregia di Massimo Mida (1953)
Cronache di poveri amanti (1953)
Siluri umani, uncredited Antonio Leonviola and Marc-Antonio Bragadin (1954)
Lo svitato (1955)
La muraglia cinese (1958)
Esterina (1959)
Il gobbo (1960)
Carabiniere a cavallo (1961)
L'oro di Roma (1961)
La vita agra (1963)
Il processo di Verona (1963)
Amori pericolosi (1964)
La Celestina P... R... (1964)
La guerra segreta (1965)
Thrilling (segment "L'autostrada del Sole", 1965)
Requiescant (1966)
Svegliati e uccidi (1966)
Un fiume di dollari (1967)
L'amante di Gramigna (1968)
Banditi a Milano (1968)
Barbagia (1969)
Amore e rabbia (1969)
Roma Bene (1971)
Torino nera (1972)
Crazy Joe (1973)
Mussolini ultimo atto (1974)
Storie di vita e di malavita (1975)
Un delitto inutile (1976)
Kleinhoff hotel (1977)
Fontamara (1980)
La casa del tappeto giallo (1983)
Mamma Ebe (1985)
Un'isola (1986)
Caro Gorbaciov (1988)
12 registi per 12 città (1989) documentary
Cattiva (1991)
Celluloide (1996)
Luchino Visconti (1999) documentary
Cesare Zavattini (2002) documentary
Napoli Napoli Napoli (2006) documentary
Agusta-Westland, un primato italiano (2007) documentary
Hotel Meina (2007)

References

External links
 

1922 births
2013 deaths
2013 suicides
David di Donatello winners
Nastro d'Argento winners
David di Donatello Career Award winners
Italian screenwriters
Italian male screenwriters
Giallo film directors
Writers from Rome
Suicides by jumping in Italy
Film directors from Rome
Burials at the Cimitero Flaminio